Egyptian Arabic, locally known as Colloquial Egyptian, or simply Masri (also Masry), is the most widely spoken vernacular Arabic dialect in Egypt. It is part of the Afro-Asiatic language family, and originated in the Nile Delta in Lower Egypt. The ca. 100 million Egyptians speak a continuum of dialects, among which Cairene is the most prominent. It is also understood across most of the Arabic-speaking countries due to broad Egyptian influence in the region, including through Egyptian cinema and Egyptian music. These factors help to make it the most widely spoken and by far the most widely studied variety of Arabic.

While it is primarily a spoken language, the written form is used in novels, plays and poems (vernacular literature), as well as in comics, advertising, some newspapers and transcriptions of popular songs. In most other written media and in radio and television news reporting, literary Arabic is used. Literary Arabic is a standardized language based on the language of the Qur'an, i.e. Classical Arabic. The Egyptian vernacular is almost universally written in the Arabic alphabet for local consumption, although it is commonly transcribed into Latin letters or in the International Phonetic Alphabet in linguistics text and textbooks aimed at teaching non-native learners. The dialect's phonetics, grammatical structure, and vocabulary are influenced by the Coptic language; its rich vocabulary is also influenced by European languages such as French, Italian, Greek, and English.

Naming 
Egyptians generally call their vernacular "Arabic" when juxtaposed with non-Arabic languages; "Colloquial Egyptian" or simply "Aamiyya" (colloquial) when juxtaposed with Standard Arabic and the Egyptian dialect or simply Masri (Egyptian) when juxtaposed with other vernacular Arabic dialects. Sometimes it is also called Modern Egyptian language.

The term Egyptian Arabic is usually used synonymously with "Cairene Arabic", which is technically a dialect of Egyptian Arabic. The country's native name, is often used locally to refer to Cairo itself. As is the case with Parisian French, Cairene Arabic is by far the most prevalent dialect in the country.

Geographic distribution 
Among the spoken varieties of Arabic, Standard Egyptian Arabic (based on the dialect of the Egyptian capital) is the only one to have become a lingua franca in other parts of the Arabic-speaking world primarily for two reasons: The proliferation and popularity of Egyptian films and other media in the region since the early 20th century as well as the great number of Egyptian teachers and professors who were instrumental in setting up the education systems of various countries in the Arabian Peninsula and also taught there and in other countries such as Algeria and Libya. Also, many Lebanese artists choose to sing in Egyptian.

Standard Egyptian Arabic, when used in documents, broadcast media, prepared speeches and sometimes in liturgical purpose, is heavily influenced by Cairene Arabic with loanwords of Modern Standard Arabic origin or code-switching between Cairene Arabic and Modern Standard Arabic.

History 

Arabic was spoken in parts of Egypt such as the Eastern Desert and Sinai before Islam. However, Nile Valley Egyptians slowly adopted Arabic as a written language following the Muslim conquest of Egypt in the seventh century. Until then, they had spoken either Koine Greek or Egyptian in its Coptic form. A period of Coptic-Arabic bilingualism in Lower Egypt lasted for more than three centuries. The period would last much longer in the south. Arabic had been already familiar to Valley Egyptians since Arabic had been spoken throughout the Eastern Desert and Sinai. Arabic was also a minority language of some residents of the Nile Valley such as Qift in Upper Egypt through pre-Islamic trade with Nabateans in the Sinai Peninsula and the easternmost part of the Nile Delta. Egyptian Arabic seems to have begun taking shape in Fustat, the first Islamic capital of Egypt, now part of Cairo.

One of the earliest linguistic sketches of Cairene Arabic is a 16th-century document entitled ("The Removal of the Burden from the Language of the People of Cairo") by Yusuf al-Maghribi. With Misr here meaning Cairo. It contains key information on early Cairene Arabic and the language situation in Egypt in the Middle Ages. The main purpose of the document was to show that while the Cairenes' vernacular contained many critical "errors" vis-à-vis Classical Arabic, according to al-Maghribi, it was also related to Arabic in other respects. With few waves of immigration from the Arabian peninsula such as the Banu Hilal exodus, who later left Egypt and were settled in Morocco and Tunisia, together with the ongoing Islamization and Arabization of the country, multiple Arabic varieties, one of which is Egyptian Arabic, slowly supplanted spoken Coptic. Local chroniclers mention the continued use of Coptic as a spoken language until the 17th century by peasant women in Upper Egypt. Coptic is still the liturgical language of the Coptic Orthodox Church of Alexandria and the Coptic Catholic Church.

Status 
Egyptian Arabic has no official status and is not officially recognized as a language (even though it has its own ISO language code). Standard Arabic is the official language of the state as per constitutional law with the name  , lit. "Arabic language". Interest in the local vernacular began in the 1800s (in opposition to the language of the ruling class, Turkish), as the Egyptian national movement for self-determination was taking shape. For many decades to follow, questions about the reform and the modernization of Arabic were hotly debated in Egyptian intellectual circles. Proposals ranged from developing neologisms to replace archaic terminology in Modern Standard Arabic to the simplification of syntactical and morphological rules and the introduction of colloquialisms to even complete "Egyptianization" by abandoning the so-called Modern Standard Arabic in favor of Masri or Egyptian Arabic.

Proponents of language reform in Egypt included Qasim Amin, who also wrote the first Egyptian feminist treatise, former President of the Egyptian University, Ahmed Lutfi el-Sayed, and noted intellectual Salama Moussa. They adopted a modernist, secular approach and disagreed with the assumption that Arabic was an immutable language because of its association with the Qur'an. The first modern Egyptian novel in which the dialogue was written in the vernacular was Muhammad Husayn Haykal's Zaynab in 1913. It was only in 1966 that Mustafa Musharafa's Kantara Who Disbelieved was released, the first novel to be written entirely in Egyptian Arabic. Other notable novelists, such as Ihsan Abdel Quddous and Yusuf Idris, and poets, such as Salah Jahin, Abdel Rahman el-Abnudi and Ahmed Fouad Negm, helped solidify vernacular literature as a distinct literary genre.

Amongst certain groups within Egypt's elite, Egyptian Arabic enjoyed a brief period of rich literary output. That dwindled with the rise of Pan-Arabism, which had gained popularity in Egypt by the second half of the twentieth century, as demonstrated by Egypt's involvement in the 1948 Arab–Israeli War under King Farouk of Egypt. The Egyptian revolution of 1952, led by Mohammed Naguib and Gamal Abdel Nasser, further enhanced the significance of Pan-Arabism, making it a central element of Egyptian state policy. The importance of Modern Standard Arabic was reemphasised in the public sphere by the revolutionary government, and efforts to accord any formal language status to the Egyptian vernacular were ignored. Egyptian Arabic was identified as a mere dialect, one that was not spoken even in all of Egypt, as almost all of Upper Egypt speaks Sa'idi Arabic. Though the revolutionary government heavily sponsored the use of the Egyptian vernacular in films, plays, television programmes, and music, the prerevolutionary use of Modern Standard Arabic in official publications was retained.

Linguistic commentators have noted the multi-faceted approach of the Egyptian revolutionaries towards the Arabic language. Whereas Egypt's first president, Mohammed Naguib exhibited a preference for using Modern Standard Arabic in his public speeches, his successor, Gamal Abdel Nasser was renowned for using the vernacular and for punctuating his speeches with traditional Egyptian words and expressions. Conversely, Modern Standard Arabic was the norm for state news outlets, including newspapers, magazines, television, and radio. That was especially true of Egypt's national broadcasting company, the Arab Radio and Television Union, which was established with the intent of providing content for the entire Arab world, not merely Egypt, hence the need to broadcast in the standard, rather than the vernacular, language. The Voice of the Arabs radio station, in particular, had an audience from across the region, and the use of anything other than Modern Standard Arabic was viewed as eminently incongruous.

In a study of three Egyptian newspapers (Al-Ahram, Al-Masry Al-Youm, and Al-Dustour) Zeinab Ibrahim concluded that the total number of headlines in Egyptian Arabic in each newspaper varied. Al-Ahram did not include any. Al-Masry Al-Youm had an average of 5% of headlines in Egyptian, while Al-Dustour averaged 11%.

As the status of Egyptian Arabic as opposed to Classical Arabic can have such political and religious implications in Egypt, the question of whether Egyptian Arabic should be considered a "dialect" or "language" can be a source of debate. In sociolinguistics, Egyptian Arabic can be seen as one of many distinct varieties that, despite arguably being languages on  grounds, are united by a common  in Modern Standard Arabic (MSA).

Publications 
During the early 1900s many portions of the Bible were published in Egyptian Arabic.  These were published by the Nile Mission Press.  By 1932 the whole New Testament and some books of the Old Testament had been published in Egyptian Arabic in Arabic script.

The dialogs in the following novels are partly in Egyptian Arabic, partly in Standard Arabic: Mahmud Tahir Haqqi's Adhra' Dinshuway (1906), Yaqub Sarruf's Fatat Misr (first published in Al-Muqtataf 1905–1906), and Mohammed Hussein Heikal's Zaynab (1914).

Early stage plays written in Egyptian Arabic were translated from or influenced by European playwrights. Muhammad 'Uthman Jalal translated plays by Molière, Racine and Goldoni to Egyptian Arabic and adapted them as well as ten fables by Jean de La Fontaine. Yaqub Sanu translated to and wrote plays on himself in Egyptian Arabic.
Many plays were written in Standard Arabic, but performed in colloquial Arabic. Tawfiq al-Hakim took this a step further and provided for his Standard Arabic plays versions in colloquial Arabic for the performances. Mahmud Taymur has published some of his plays in two versions, one in Standard, one in colloquial Arabic, among them: Kidb fi Kidb (1951 or ca. 1952) and Al-Muzayyifun (ca. 1953).

The writers of stage plays in Egyptian Arabic after the Egyptian Revolution of 1952 include No'man Ashour, Alfred Farag, Rashad Roushdy, and Yusuf Idris. Thereafter the use of colloquial Egyptian Arabic in theater is stable and common. Later writers of plays in colloquial Egyptian include Ali Salem, and Naguib Surur.

Novels in Egyptian Arabic after the 1940s and before the 1990s are rare. There are by  Qantarah Alladhi Kafar (Cairo, 1965) and Uthman Sabri's (1896–1986) Journey on the Nile (1965) (and his Bet Sirri (1981) that apparently uses a mix of Standard Arabic and Egyptian Arabic).

Prose published in Egyptian Arabic since the 1990s include the following novels:
Yusuf al-Qa'id's Laban il-Asfur (1994),
Baha' Awwad's Shams il-Asil (1998),
Safa Abdel Al Moneim's Min Halawit il-Ruh (1998),
Samih Faraj's Banhuf Ishtirasa (1999);
autobiographies include the one by Ahmed Fouad Negm,
by  Ula Awwil,
and Fathia al-Assal's Hudn il-Umr.

The epistolary novel Jawabat Haraji il-Gutt (2001) by Abdel Rahman el-Abnudi is exceptional in its use of Saʽidi Arabic.

21th-century journals publishing in Egyptian Arabic include Bārti (from at least 2002), the weekly magazine Idhak lil-Dunya (from 2005), and the monthly magazine  (from 2005).

Spoken varieties 
Sa'īdi Arabic is a different variety than Egyptian Arabic in Ethnologue.com and ISO 639-3 and in other sources, and the two varieties have limited mutual intelligibility. It carries little prestige nationally but continues to be widely spoken, with 19,000,000 speakers.

The traditional division between Upper and Lower Egypt and their respective differences go back to ancient times. Egyptians today commonly call the people of the north  and those of the south . The differences throughout Egypt, however, are more wide-ranging and do not neatly correspond to the simple division. The language shifts from the eastern to the western parts of the Nile Delta, and the varieties spoken from Giza to Minya are further grouped into a Middle Egypt cluster. Despite the differences, there are features distinguishing all the Egyptian Arabic varieties of the Nile Valley from any other varieties of Arabic. Such features include reduction of long vowels in open and unstressed syllables, the postposition of demonstratives and interrogatives, the modal meaning of the imperfect and the integration of the participle.

The Western Egyptian Bedawi Arabic variety of the western desert differs from all other Arabic varieties in Egypt in that it linguistically is part of Maghrebi Arabic. Northwest Arabian Arabic is also distinct from Egyptian Arabic.

Regional variation 

Egyptian Arabic varies regionally across its sprachraum, with certain characteristics being noted as typical of the speech of certain regions.

Alexandria 
The dialect of Alexandria (West Delta) is noted for certain shibboleths separating its speech from that of Cairo (South Delta).
The speech of the older Alexandrian families is also noted for use of the first-person plural even when they speak in the singular, a feature of Maghrebi Arabic.

Port Said 
Port Said's dialect (East Delta) is noted for a "heavier", more guttural sound, compared to other regions of the country.

Rural Nile Delta 
The dialect also has many grammatical differences when contrasted to urban dialects.

Phonology 

Egyptian Arabic has a phonology that differs significantly from that of other varieties of Arabic, and has its own inventory of consonants and vowels.

Morphology

Nouns 
As all nouns take their pausal forms, singular words and broken plurals simply lose their case endings. In sound plurals and dual forms, where, in MSA, difference in case is present even in pausal forms, the genitive/accusative form is the one preserved. Fixed expressions in the construct state beginning in abu, often geographic names, retain their -u in all cases.

Plurals 
Nouns take either a sound plural or broken plural. The sound plural is formed by adding endings, and can be considered part of the declension. For the broken plural, however, a different pattern for the stem is used.
The sound plural with the suffix  is used for nouns referring to male persons that are participles or follow the pattern CaCCaaC. It takes the form  for nouns of the form CaCCa and the form  for nisba adjectives.

Color/defect nouns 

A common set of nouns referring to colors, as well as a number of nouns referring to physical defects of various sorts (ʔaṣlaʕ "bald"; ʔaṭṛaʃ "deaf"; ʔaxṛas "dumb"), take a special inflectional pattern, as shown in the table.  Note that only a small number of common colors inflect this way: ʔaḥmaṛ "red"; ʔazraʔ "blue"; ʔaxḍaṛ "green"; ʔaṣfaṛ "yellow"; ʔabyaḍ "white"; ʔiswid "black"; ʔasmaṛ "brown-skinned, brunette"; ʔaʃʔaṛ "blond(e)".  The remaining colors are invariable, and mostly so-called nisba adjectives derived from colored objects: bunni "brown" (< bunn "coffee powder"); ṛamaadi "gray" (< ṛamaad "ashes"); banafsigi "purple" (< banafsig "violet"); burtuʔaani "orange" (< burtuʔaan "oranges"); zibiibi "maroon" (< zibiib "raisins"); etc., or of foreign origin: beeع "beige" from the French; bamba "pink" from Turkish pembe.

Pronouns 

Egyptian Arabic object pronouns are clitics, in that they attach to the end of a noun, verb, or preposition, with the result forming a single phonological word rather than separate words.  Clitics can be attached to the following types of words:
A clitic pronoun attached to a noun indicates possession: béet "house", béet-i "my house"; sikkíina "knife", sikkínt-i "my knife";  ʔább "father", ʔabúu-ya "my father".  Note that the form of a pronoun may vary depending on the phonological form of the word being attached to (ending with a vowel or with one or two consonants), and the noun being attached to may also have a separate "construct" form before possessive clitic suffixes.
A clitic pronoun attached to a preposition indicates the object of the preposition:  minno "from it (masculine object)", ʕaleyha "on it (feminine object)"
A clitic pronoun attached to a verb indicates the object of the verb: ʃúft "I saw", ʃúft-u "I saw him", ʃuft-áha "I saw her".

With verbs, indirect object clitic pronouns can be formed using the preposition li- plus a clitic.  Both direct and indirect object clitic pronouns can be attached to a single verb: agíib "I bring", agíb-hu "I bring it", agib-húu-lik "I bring it to you", m-agib-hu-lkíi-ʃ "I do not bring it to you".

Verbs 
Verbs in Arabic are based on a stem made up of three or four consonants. The set of consonants communicates the basic meaning of a verb. Changes to the vowels in between the consonants, along with prefixes and/or suffixes, specify grammatical functions such as tense, person, and number, in addition to changes in the meaning of the verb that embody grammatical concepts such as causative, intensive, passive or reflexive.

Each particular lexical verb is specified by two stems, one used for the past tense and one used for non-past tenses along with subjunctive and imperative moods. To the former stem, suffixes are added to mark the verb for person, number, and gender, while to the latter stem, a combination of prefixes and suffixes are added. (Very approximately, the prefixes specify the person and the suffixes indicate number and gender.) Since Arabic lacks an infinitive, the third person masculine singular past tense form serves as the "dictionary form" used to identify a verb. For example, the verb meaning "write" is often specified as kátab, which actually means "he wrote". In the paradigms below, a verb will be specified as kátab/yíktib (where kátab means "he wrote" and yíktib means "he writes"), indicating the past stem (katab-) and non-past stem (-ktib-, obtained by removing the prefix yi-).

The verb classes in Arabic are formed along two axes.  One axis (described as "form I", "form II", etc.) is used to specify grammatical concepts such as causative, intensive, passive, or reflexive, and involves varying the stem form.  For example, from the root K-T-B "write" is derived form I kátab/yíktib "write", form II káttib/yikáttib "cause to write", form III ká:tib/yiká:tib "correspond", etc.  The other axis is determined by the particular consonants making up the root.  For example, defective verbs have a W or Y as the last root consonant, which is often reflected in paradigms with an extra final vowel in the stem (e.g. ráma/yírmi "throw" from R-M-Y); meanwhile, hollow verbs have a W or Y as the middle root consonant, and the stems of such verbs appear to have only two consonants (e.g. gá:b/yigí:b "bring" from G-Y-B).

Strong verbs 
Strong verbs are those that have no "weakness" (e.g. W or Y) in the root consonants.
Each verb has a given vowel pattern for Past (a or i) and Present (a or i or u). Combinations of each exist.

Regular verbs, form I 

Form I verbs have a given vowel pattern for past (a or i) and present (a, i or u). Combinations of each exist:

Regular verb, form I, fáʕal/yífʕil 

Example: kátab/yíktib "write"

Note that, in general, the present indicative is formed from the subjunctive by the addition of bi- (bi-a- is elided to ba-).  Similarly, the future is formed from the subjunctive by the addition of ḥa- (ḥa-a- is elided to ḥa-).  The i in bi- or in the following prefix will be deleted according to the regular rules of vowel syncope:
híyya b-tíktib "she writes" (híyya + bi- + tíktib)
híyya bi-t-ʃú:f "she sees" (híyya + bi- + tiʃú:f)
an-áktib "I write (subjunctive)" (ána + áktib)

Example: kátab/yíktib "write": non-finite forms

Regular verb, form I, fíʕil/yífʕal 

Example: fíhim/yífham "understand"

Boldfaced forms fíhm-it and fíhm-u differ from the corresponding forms of katab (kátab-it and kátab-u due to vowel syncope).  Note also the syncope in ána fhím-t "I understood".

Regular verb, form II, fáʕʕil/yifáʕʕil 

Example: dárris/yidárris "teach"

Boldfaced forms indicate the primary differences from the corresponding forms of katab:
The prefixes ti-, yi-, ni- have elision of i following bi- or ḥa- (all verbs whose stem begins with a single consonant behave this way).
The imperative prefix i- is missing (again, all verbs whose stem begins with a single consonant behave this way).
Due to the regular operation of the stress rules, the stress in the past tense forms darrís-it and darrís-u differs from kátab-it and kátab-u.

Regular verb, form III, fá:ʕil/yifá:ʕil 

Example: sá:fir/yisá:fir "travel"

The primary differences from the corresponding forms of darris (shown in boldface) are:
The long vowel a: becomes a when unstressed.
The i in the stem sa:fir is elided when a suffix beginning with a vowel follows.

Defective verbs 

Defective verbs have a W or Y as the last root consonant.

Defective verb, form I, fáʕa/yífʕi 

Example: ráma/yírmi "throw away" (i.e. trash, etc.)

The primary differences from the corresponding forms of katab (shown in boldface) are:
In the past, there are three stems: ráma with no suffix, ramé:- with a consonant-initial suffix, rám- with a vowel initial suffix.
In the non-past, the stem rmi becomes rm- before a (vowel initial) suffix, and the stress remains on the prefix, since the stem vowel has been elided.
Note also the accidental homonymy between masculine tí-rmi, í-rmi and feminine tí-rm-i, í-rm-i.

Defective verb, form I, fíʕi/yífʕa 

Example: nísi/yínsa "forget"

This verb type is quite similar to the defective verb type ráma/yírmi.  The primary differences are:
The occurrence of i and a in the stems are reversed: i in the past, a in the non-past.
In the past, instead of the stems ramé:- and rám-, the verb has nisí:- (with a consonant-initial suffix) and nísy- (with a vowel initial suffix).  Note in particular the |y| in nísyit and nísyu as opposed to rámit and rámu.
Elision of i in nisí:- can occur, e.g. ána nsí:t "I forgot".
In the non-past, because the stem has a instead of i, there is no homonymy between masculine tí-nsa, í-nsa and feminine tí-ns-i, í-ns-i.

Note that some other verbs have different stem variations, e.g. míʃi/yímʃi "walk" (with i in both stems) and báʔa/yíbʔa "become, remain" (with a in both stems).  The verb láʔa/yilá:ʔi "find" is unusual in having a mixture of a form I past and form III present (note also the variations líʔi/yílʔa and láʔa/yílʔa).

Verbs other than form I have consistent stem vowels.  All such verbs have a in the past (hence form stems with -é:-, not -í:-).  Forms V, VI, X and IIq have a in the present (indicated by boldface below); others have i; forms VII, VIIt, and VIII have i in both vowels of the stem (indicated by italics below); form IX verbs, including "defective" verbs, behave as regular doubled verbs:
 Form II: wádda/yiwáddi "take away"; ʔáwwa/yiʔáwwi "strengthen"
 Form III: ná:da/yiná:di "call"; dá:wa/yidá:wi "treat, cure"
 Form IV (rare, classicized): ʔárḍa/yírḍi "please, satisfy"
 Form V: itʔáwwa/yitʔáwwa "become strong"
 Form VI: itdá:wa/yitdá:wa "be treated, be cured"
 Form VII (rare in the Cairene dialect): inḥáka/yinḥíki "be told"
 Form VIIt: itnása/yitnísi "be forgotten"
 Form VIII: iʃtára/yiʃtíri "buy"
 Form IX (very rare): iḥláww/yiḥláww "be/become sweet"
 Form X: istákfa/yistákfa "have enough"
 Form Iq: need example
 Form IIq: need example

Hollow verbs 
Hollow have a W or Y as the middle root consonant.  Note that for some forms (e.g. form II and form III), hollow verbs are conjugated as strong verbs (e.g. form II ʕáyyin/yiʕáyyin "appoint" from ʕ-Y-N, form III gá:wib/yigá:wib "answer" from G-W-B).

Hollow verb, form I, fá:l/yifí:l 

Example: gá:b/yigí:b "bring"

This verb works much like dárris/yidárris "teach".  Like all verbs whose stem begins with a single consonant, the prefixes differ in the following way from those of regular and defective form I verbs:
The prefixes ti-, yi-, ni- have elision of i following bi- or ḥa-.
The imperative prefix i- is missing.

In addition, the past tense has two stems: gíb- before consonant-initial suffixes (first and second person) and gá:b- elsewhere (third person).

Hollow verb, form I, fá:l/yifú:l 

Example: ʃá:f/yiʃú:f "see"

This verb class is identical to verbs such as gá:b/yigí:b except in having stem vowel u in place of i.

Doubled verbs 

Doubled verbs have the same consonant as middle and last root consonant, e.g. ḥább/yiḥíbb "love" from Ḥ-B-B.

Doubled verb, form I, fáʕʕ/yifíʕʕ 

Example: ḥább/yiḥíbb "love"

This verb works much like gá:b/yigí:b "bring".  Like that class, it has two stems in the past, which are ḥabbé:- before consonant-initial suffixes (first and second person) and ḥább- elsewhere (third person).  Note that é:- was borrowed from the defective verbs; the Classical Arabic equivalent form would be *ḥabáb-, e.g. *ḥabáb-t.

Other verbs have u or a in the present stem: baṣṣ/yibúṣṣ "to look", ṣaḥḥ/yiṣáḥḥ "be right, be proper".

As for the other forms:
Form II, V doubled verbs are strong: ḥáddid/yiḥáddid "limit, fix (appointment)"
Form III, IV, VI, VIII doubled verbs seem non-existent
Form VII and VIIt doubled verbs (same stem vowel a in both stems): inbáll/yinbáll "be wetted", itʕádd/yitʕádd
Form VIII doubled verbs (same stem vowel a in both stems): ihtámm/yihtámm "be interested (in)"
Form IX verbs (automatically behave as "doubled" verbs, same stem vowel a in both stems): iḥmárr/yiḥmárr "be red, blush", iḥláww/yiḥláww "be sweet"
Form X verbs (stem vowel either a or i in non-past): istaḥáʔʔ/yistaḥáʔʔ "deserve" vs. istaʕádd/yistaʕídd "be ready", istamárr/yistamírr "continue".

Assimilated verbs 

Assimilated verbs have W or Y as the first root consonant.  Most of these verbs have been regularized in Egyptian Arabic, e.g. wázan/yíwzin "to weigh" or wíṣíl/yíwṣal "to arrive".  Only a couple of irregular verbs remain, e.g. wíʔif/yúʔaf "stop" and wíʔiʕ/yúʔaʕ "fall" (see below).

Doubly weak verbs 

"Doubly weak" verbs have more than one "weakness", typically a W or Y as both the second and third consonants.  This term is in fact a misnomer, as such verbs actually behave as normal defective verbs (e.g. káwa/yíkwi "iron (clothes)" from K-W-Y, ʔáwwa/yiʔáwwi "strengthen" from ʔ-W-Y, dá:wa/yidá:wi "treat, cure" from D-W-Y).

Irregular verbs 

The irregular verbs are as follows:

ídda/yíddi "give" (endings like a normal defective verb)
wíʔif/yúʔaf "stop" and wíʔiʕ/yúʔaʕ "fall" (áʔaf, báʔaf, ḥáʔaf "I (will) stop"; úʔaf "stop!")
kal/yá:kul "eat" and xad/yá:xud "take" (kalt, kal, kálit, kálu "I/he/she/they ate", also regular ákal, etc. "he/etc. ate"; á:kul, bá:kul, ḥá:kul "I (will) eat", yáklu "they eat"; kúl, kúli, kúlu "eat!"; wá:kil "eating"; mittá:kil "eaten")
gé/yí:gi "come".  This verb is extremely irregular (with particularly unusual forms in boldface):

Example: gé/yí:gi "come": non-finite forms

Table of verb forms 

In this section all verb classes and their corresponding stems are listed, excluding the small number of irregular verbs described above.  Verb roots are indicated schematically using capital letters to stand for consonants in the root:
F = first consonant of root
M = middle consonant of three-consonant root
S = second consonant of four-consonant root
T = third consonant of four-consonant root
L = last consonant of root
Hence, the root F-M-L stands for all three-consonant roots, and F-S-T-L stands for all four-consonant roots. (Traditional Arabic grammar uses F-ʕ-L and F-ʕ-L-L, respectively, but the system used here appears in a number of grammars of spoken Arabic dialects and is probably less confusing for English speakers, since the forms are easier to pronounce than those involving ʕ.)

The following table lists the prefixes and suffixes to be added to mark tense, person, number and gender, and the stem form to which they are added.  The forms involving a vowel-initial suffix, and corresponding stem PAv or NPv, are highlighted in silver.  The forms involving a consonant-initial suffix, and corresponding stem PAc, are highlighted in gold.  The forms involving a no suffix, and corresponding stem PA0 or NP0, are unhighlighted.

The following table lists the verb classes along with the form of the past and non-past stems, active and passive participles, and verbal noun, in addition to an example verb for each class.

Notes:
Italicized forms are those that follow automatically from the regular rules of vowel shortening and deletion.
Multisyllabic forms without a stress mark have variable stress, depending on the nature of the suffix added, following the regular rules of stress assignment.
Many participles and verbal nouns have acquired an extended sense.  In fact, participles and verbal nouns are the major sources for lexical items based on verbs, especially derived (i.e. non-Form-I) verbs.
Some verb classes do not have a regular verbal noun form; rather, the verbal noun varies from verb to verb.  Even in verb classes that do have a regular verbal noun form, there are exceptions.  In addition, some verbs share a verbal noun with a related verb from another class (in particular, many passive verbs use the corresponding active verb's verbal noun, which can be interpreted in either an active or passive sense).  Some verbs appear to lack a verbal noun entirely. (In such a case, a paraphrase would be used involving a clause beginning with inn.)
Outside of Form I, passive participles as such are usually non-existent; instead, the active participle of the corresponding passive verb class (e.g. Forms V, VI, VIIt/VIIn for Forms II, III, I respectively) is used.  The exception is certain verbs in Forms VIII and X that contain a "classicized" passive participle that is formed in imitation of the corresponding participle in Classical Arabic, e.g. mistáʕmil "using", mustáʕmal "used".
Not all forms have a separate verb class for hollow or doubled roots.  When no such class is listed below, roots of that shape appear as strong verbs in the corresponding form, e.g. Form II strong verb ḍáyyaʕ/yiḍáyyaʕ "waste, lose" related to Form I hollow verb ḍá:ʕ/yiḍí:ʕ "be lost", both from root Ḍ-Y-ʕ.

Negation 

One characteristic feature of Egyptian syntax is the two-part negative verbal circumfix , which it shares with other North African dialect areas as well as some southern Levantine dialect areas, probably as a result of the influence of Egyptian Arabic on these areas:

 Past:  "he wrote"  "he didn't write" 
 Present:  "he writes"  "he doesn't write" 

 probably comes from the Arabic negator . This negating circumfix is similar in function to the French circumfix . It should also be noted that Coptic and Ancient Egyptian both had negative circumfix.

The structure can end in a consonant  or in a vowel , varying according to the individual or region. Nowadays speakers use . However,  was sometimes used stylistically, specially in the past, as attested in old films.

The negative circumfix often surrounds the entire verbal composite including direct and indirect object pronouns:
   "he didn't write them to me"
However, verbs in the future tense can instead use the prefix /miʃ/:
  (or   "he won't write"
Interrogative sentences can be formed by adding the negation clitic "(miʃ)" before the verb:
 Past:  "he wrote";  "didn't he write?"
 Present:  "he writes";  "doesn't he write?"
 Future:  "he will write";  "won't he write?"
Addition of the circumfix can cause complex changes to the verbal cluster, due to the application of the rules of vowel syncope, shortening, lengthening, insertion and elision described above:
 The addition of /ma-/ may trigger elision or syncope:
A vowel following /ma-/ is elided: (ixtáːr) "he chose" →.
A short vowel /i/ or /u/ in the first syllable may be deleted by syncope: (kíbir) "he grew" → (makbírʃ).
 The addition of  may result in vowel shortening or epenthesis:
 A final long vowel preceding a single consonant shortens: (ixtáːr) "he chose" → (maxtárʃ).
 An unstressed epenthetic /i/ is inserted when the verbal complex ends in two consonants: /kunt/ "I was" → (makúntiʃ).
 In addition, the addition of  triggers a stress shift, which may in turn result in vowel shortening or lengthening:
 The stress shifts to the syllable preceding : (kátab) "he wrote" → (makatábʃ).
 A long vowel in the previously stressed syllable shortens: (ʃáːfit) "she saw" → (maʃafítʃ); (ʃá:fu) "they saw" or "he saw it" → (maʃafú:ʃ).
 A final short vowel directly preceding  lengthens: (ʃáːfu) "they saw" or "he saw it" → (maʃafú:ʃ).

In addition, certain other morphological changes occur:
 (ʃafúː) "they saw him" → (maʃafuhúːʃ) (to avoid a clash with (maʃafúːʃ) "they didn't see/he didn't see him").
 (ʃáːfik) "He saw you (fem. sg.)" → (maʃafkíːʃ).
 (ʃúftik) "I saw you (fem. sg.)" → (maʃuftikíːʃ).

Syntax 
In contrast with Classical Arabic, but much like the other varieties of Arabic, Egyptian Arabic prefers subject–verb–object (SVO) word order; CA and to a lesser extent MSA prefer verb–subject–object (VSO). For example, in MSA "Adel read the book" would be    whereas EA would say   .

Also in common with other Arabic varieties is the loss of unique agreement in the dual form: while the dual remains productive to some degree in nouns, dual nouns are analyzed as plural for the purpose of agreement with verbs, demonstratives, and adjectives. Thus "These two Syrian professors are walking to the university" in MSA (in an SVO sentence for ease of comparison) would be ""  , which becomes in EA "" , .

Unlike most other forms of Arabic, however, Egyptian prefers final placement of question words in interrogative sentences. This is a feature characteristic of the Coptic substratum of Egyptian Arabic.

Coptic substratum 

Some authors have argued for the influence of a substratum of the Coptic language which was the native language of the vast majority of Nile Valley Egyptians prior to the Muslim conquest on Egyptian Arabic, specifically on its phonology, syntax, and lexicon. Coptic is the latest stage of the indigenous Egyptian language spoken until the mid-17th century when it was finally completely supplanted among Egyptian Muslims and a majority of Copts by the Egyptian Arabic.

Phonology 
Since Coptic lacked interdental consonants it could possibly have influenced the manifestation of their occurrences in Classical Arabic    as their dental counterparts   and the emphatic dental  respectively. (see consonants)

Behnstedt argues that the phenomenon of merging of interdentals with plosives has also occurred in areas without a substratum lacking interdentals, e.g. in Mecca, Aden and Bahrain, and can be caused by drift rather than the influence of a substratum concluding that "[o]n the phonological level, there is no evidence for Coptic substratal influence."

Syntax 
A syntactic feature of to Egyptian Arabic arguably inherited from Coptic is the remaining of wh-words (i.e. "who", "when", "why") in their "logical" positions in a sentence rather than being preposed, or moved to the front of the sentence, as in (mostly) in Classical Arabic or English.

Examples:
  "When did he go to Egypt?" (lit. "He went to Egypt when?")
  "Why did he go to Egypt? (lit. "He went to Egypt why?")
  or  "Who went to Egypt/Cairo? (literally – same order)
The same sentences in Literary Arabic (with all the question words (wh-words) in the beginning of the sentence) would be:
  
  
  

Diem argues that in Cairene Arabic also the preposition of wh-words occurs and in Classical Arabic and other Arabic dialects also their postposition and thus the effect of a Coptic substratum might be – if at all – the preference for one of the two possibilities.

Lexicon 
Behnstedt estimates the existence of ca. 250 to 300 Coptic loanwords in Egyptian Arabic.

Orthography and romanization

Orthography 
There is no fixed orthography for Egyptian Arabic.
Where it is written in Arabic script the orthography varies between spellings closer to those of Standard Arabic and spellings closer to the phonology of Egyptian Arabic.
This variability arises from the deficiency of the Arabic script for writing the colloquial Egyptian Arabic, for which it is not designed. Part of this is the unavailability of signs for some sounds of Egyptian Arabic that are not part of Standard Arabic.
Both options are used in parallel, often even in by one author or in one work.
The two options appears for example for these cases:
 etymological spelling with the shortly pronounced originally long vowel "ا": ,
 phonetic spelling without the "ا": ;

Romanization 

In the table below romanizations by different authors starting with Spitta's from 1880 are given as examples of the variety of those used.
Where authors use custom glyphs the ones given try the best available approximation.
The use of transcribing glyphs among different authors and between those and a representation of Egyptian Arabic in Arabic script (in doubt  is used above) can't be exactly aligned because different authors use different analyses of the studied language. Here also the table above tries to give a good approximation.

Sociolinguistic features 

Egyptian Arabic is used in most social situations, with Modern Standard and Classical Arabic generally being used only in writing and in highly religious and/or formal situations. However, within Egyptian Arabic, there is a wide range of variation. El-Said Badawi identifies three distinct levels of Egyptian Arabic-based chiefly on the quantity of non-Arabic lexical items in the vocabulary: ʿĀmmiyyat al-Musaqqafīn (Cultured Colloquial or Formal Spoken Arabic), ʿĀmmiyyat al-Mutanawwirīn (Enlightened or Literate Colloquial), and ʿĀmmiyyat al-'Ummiyīn (Illiterate Colloquial). Cultured Colloquial/Formal Spoken Arabic is characteristic of the educated classes and is the language of discussion of high-level subjects, but it is still Egyptian Arabic; it is characterized by use of technical terms imported from foreign languages and MSA and closer attention to the pronunciation of certain letters (particularly qāf). It is relatively standardized and, being closer to the standard, it is understood fairly well across the Arab world. On the opposite end of the spectrum, Illiterate Colloquial, common to rural areas and to working-class neighborhoods in the cities, has an almost-exclusively Arabic vocabulary; the few loanwords generally are very old borrowings (e.g.  ,  "shrimp", from Italian gamberi, "shrimp" (pl.)) or refer to technological items that find no or poor equivalents in Arabic (e.g.   , television). Enlightened Colloquial (ʿĀmmiyyat al-Mutanawwirīn) is the language of those who have had some schooling and are relatively affluent; loanwords tend to refer to items of popular culture, consumer products, and fashions. It is also understood widely in the Arab world, as it is the lingua franca of Egyptian cinema and television.

In contrast to MSA and most other varieties of Arabic, Egyptian Arabic has a form of the T-V distinction. In the singular,  enta/enti is acceptable in most situations, but to address clear social superiors (e.g. older persons, superiors at work, certain government officials), the form  , meaning "Your Grace" is preferred (compare Spanish usted).

The honorific taken by a given person is determined by their relationship to the speaker and their occupation.

Other honorifics also exist.

In usage, honorifics are used in the second and third person.

Study 
Egyptian Arabic has been a subject of study by scholars and laypersons in the past and the present for many reasons, including personal interest, egyptomania, business, news reporting, and diplomatic and political interactions. Egyptian Colloquial Arabic (ECA) is now a field of study in both graduate and undergraduate levels in many higher education institutions and universities in the world. When added to academic instruction, Arabic-language schools and university programs provide Egyptian Arabic courses in a classroom fashion, and others facilitate classes for online study.

Sample text 
Article 1 of the Universal Declaration of Human Rights

Egyptian/Masri (Arabic script; spelling not standardised):

Franco/Arabic Chat Alphabet (has no strict standard):
el e3lan el 3alami le 72u2 el ensan, el band el awalani

el bani2admin kollohom mawlodin 7orrin we metsawyin fel karama wel 7o2u2. Etwahablohom el 3a2l wel damir, wel mafrud ye3amlo ba3dihom be ro7 el akhaweya.

IPA Phonemic transcription (for comparison with Literary Arabic):

IPA phonemic transcription (for a general demonstration of Egyptian phonology):

IPA phonetic transcription morphologically (in fast speech, long vowels are half-long or without distinctive length):

English:
Article 1 of the Universal Declaration of Human Rights

All human beings are born free and equal in dignity and rights. They are endowed with reason and conscience and should act towards one another in the spirit of brotherhood.

Sample words and sentences 
   ("How are you [m.]")
   ("How are you [f.]")
   ("How are you [pl.]")
   ("What's all this?", "What's the point", "What's this?" – expression of annoyance)
 Ex.:   ("Why are you telling them such things about me, what's all this?")
  : several meanings, though its main meaning is "enough", often adverbial
 "Stop it!" Ex.:   ("I'm annoyed, stop it!")
 "It's over!", "finally, eventually"   Ex.: | ("My mother was ill and died finally." [or "...and it's over now"])
 "Ok, then!" Ex.:   ("I'll see you tomorrow then")
   ("at all")
   ("We have nothing at all to say")
   ("It's enough!" or "That's enough")
   ("that's to say" or "meaning" or "y'know")
   ("What does that mean?")
   ("When are you finishing exactly, then?)
   (particle of enforcement → "just" in imperative clauses and "well,...then?" in questions)
   ("Just give it to me!)"   or   ("Well, what did he do then?")

See also 
 Arabic language
 Bayoumi Andil
 Classical Arabic
 Coptic language
 Egyptian Arabic Wikipedia
 Egyptian language
 Futuh or early Muslim military expansions
 Modern Standard Arabic
 UCLA Language Materials Project
 Varieties of Arabic

Explanatory notes 

  Classical Arabic pronunciation: ; Literary Arabic: .
  Classical Arabic pronunciation: ; Literary Arabic: .
  Classical Arabic pronunciation: ; Literary Arabic: .

Citations

General sources 
 
 
 
 
 
 
 
 
 
 
 Gary, Judith Olmsted, & Saad Gamal-Eldin. 1982. Cairene Egyptian Colloquial Arabic. Lingua Descriptive Studies 6.  Amsterdam: North Holland.
 
 
 
 Mitchell, T. F. 1956. An Introduction to Egyptian Colloquial Arabic. Oxford: Oxford University Press.
 Mitchell, T. F. 1962. Colloquial Arabic: the Living Language of Egypt. London: The English universities Press.
 
 
 
 
 Tomiche, Nada. 1964. Le parler arabe du Caire. Paris: Mouton.

External links 

 "An Arabist's Guide to Egyptian Colloquial" by Daniel Pipes (Archive)
 Lisaan Masry Egyptian Arabic Dictionary
 Coptic Words in Egyptian Arabic 
 Description of Egyptian Arabic from UCLA's Language Materials Project 
 A review on the book Present Culture in Egypt 

 
Arabic languages
Egyptian culture
Languages of Africa
Languages of Egypt
North Africa